The 2001 Individual Speedway Junior World Championship was the 25th edition of the World motorcycle speedway Under-21 Championships.

The final took place on 26 August, to determine the champion. The final was won by Dawid Kujawa who qualified for the Speedway Grand Prix Challenge (a qualifying event for the 2002 Speedway Grand Prix) but he became injured and his place was taken by the runner-up Lukáš Dryml. Dryml eventually qualified for the 2002 Speedway Grand Prix.

World final
August 26, 2001
 Peterborough, East of England Showground

References

2001
World I J
2001 in British motorsport
Speedway competitions in the United Kingdom
August 2001 sports events in the United Kingdom